The 1962 Individual Long Track European Championship was the sixth edition of the Long Track European Championship. The final was held on 22 July 1962 in Mühldorf, West Germany.

The  title was won by Bertil Stridh of Sweden.

Venues
Qualifying Round 1 - Aarhus, 27 May 1962
Qualifying Round 2 - Hamburg, 17 June 1962
Qualifying Round 3 - Tampere, 1 July 1962
Final - Mühldorf, 22 July 1962

Final Classification

References 

Motor
Motor
International sports competitions hosted by West Germany